Xuxa só para Baixinhos 5 or Xuxa Circo (also known as XSPB 5) is the twenty-seventh studio album and the 20th in Portuguese by Brazilian singer and TV host Xuxa, released by Som Livre on September 29, 2004, is the fifth album in the Só Para Baixinhos collection.

Release and reception
Xuxa só para Baixinhos 5, was released on September 29, 2004, first in the version CD, cassette and VHS and released in DVD in November 2004, it was remastered and released in CD in 2008 in economic version. This album was one of the biggest hits of the series Xuxa só para Baixinhos. It reached the 8th position in the ranking of the most sold CDs and the 5th place among the DVDs, according to the Associação Brasileira dos Produtores de Discos. The album sold over 100,000 copies on DVD, yielding diamond certification. The singles were "Soco, Bate, Vira", "O Circo já Chegou" and "Piruetas".

The success of the Xuxa Circo, led to the launch of a tour that traveled Brazil and later released on DVD live.

Track listing

Personnel
Art Direction: Xuxa Meneghel
Production: Ary Sperling
Vocal Preparation (Xuxa): Ângela de Castro
Mixing: Discover Studio (Rio de Janeiro, Brasil)
Recording Engineers: Val Andrade e Ary Sperling
Mastering Engineer: Evren Goknar
Mastering: Capitol Mastering (Los Angeles, USA)
Musical Coordination: Vanessa Alves
Recorded in studio: Viva Voz (Rio de Janeiro, Brasil)
Production Engineer: Guilherme Reis, Arranjos, Regência
Voices guide to Xuxa: Vanessa Alves
Guiding Voice (Music "Alguém"): Ana Cecília Calderón
Special participation (Music "Piruetas"): Renato Aragão

Certifications

References

External links 
 Xuxa só para Baixinhos 5 at Discogs

2004 albums
2004 video albums
Xuxa albums
Xuxa video albums
Children's music albums by Brazilian artists
Portuguese-language video albums
Portuguese-language albums
Som Livre albums